The men's hammer throw event at the 2016 African Championships in Athletics was held on 25 June in Kings Park Stadium.

Results

References

2016 African Championships in Athletics
Hammer throw at the African Championships in Athletics